Doreen Sark is a former Canadian politician, who was interim leader of the Prince Edward Island New Democratic Party from 1979 to 1981. Leading the party in the 1979 provincial election, she was the first woman ever to lead a political party in the province in an election campaign.

References

New Democratic Party of Prince Edward Island leaders
Women in Prince Edward Island politics
Female Canadian political party leaders
Prince Edward Island candidates for Member of Parliament
New Democratic Party candidates for the Canadian House of Commons
20th-century Canadian women politicians
Living people
Year of birth missing (living people)